The Kaban Lakes are a system of lakes in Kazan, Republic of Tatarstan, Russia that includes Nizhny (Blizhny) Kaban, Verkhny Kaban, and Sredny Kaban. They make up Tatarstan's largest lake, measuring 1.86 square kilometers (0.72 square miles) in total.

The lakes are connected with the Kazanka River by the Bolaq channel and a subterranean channel from Bolaq-Kazansu. The city's sewage system also connects them to the Volga River.

The Thousandth Anniversary of Islam Mosque is situated on the bank.

The medieval Volga Bulgarians' graves which date back to 12-13th century were founded on the banks of Arğı Qaban.

One legend claims that, in the days before the Khanate of Kazan fell, the Khans threw all their valuables into the lakes.

Another legend about the origin of the lakes' names claims that, at the Mongol invasion of Volga Bulgaria, the Bulgarian prince Qabanbäk, escaped from Bilär city (or in Bolghar), fled to the banks of the lake and built a castle. Another version is that he founded İske Qazan.

Tatar myth also places Zilant, who had been transformed to Diü, as the ruler of the mythological Underwater Kingdom of Kaban.

References

Kazan
Lakes of Tatarstan